Isognathus menechus is a moth of the  family Sphingidae.

Distribution 
It is found from Cuba to Bolivia, Argentina and Brazil.

Description 
It is a heavy-bodied species. The upperside of the body and forewings has a bluish-grey cast and the bands on the upperside of the abdomen are well marked.

Biology 
There are probably multiple generations per year.

The larvae have been recorded feeding on Himatanthus lancifolius. They have long tails and are very colourful, suggesting they are unpalatable to birds.

References

Isognathus
Moths described in 1875